Michael or Mike Hartley may refer to:

Mike Hartley (born 1961), former Major League Baseball right-handed pitcher
Michael Hartley (bobsleigh) (born 1946), Olympic bobsleigh competitor for Canada at the 1972 Winter Olympics
Michael Hartley (footballer) (born 1993), Australian rules footballer
Michael Hartley (rugby union), UAE rugby union player who competed at the 2011 Asian Five Nations
Michael Hartley (high jumper), English high jumper who competed at the 2011 Commonwealth Youth Games
Michael Carr-Hartley (born 1942), Kenyan Olympic sport shooter
Mike Hartley (runner) (born 1952), British runner